Sampaio is a railway station in Sampaio, Rio de Janeiro which is serviced by the Supervia.

History
Sampaio Station was opened in 1885, being part of the first section of the Central do Brasil Railroad, between Rio de Janeiro and Nova Iguaçu. With the growth of the city of Rio de Janeiro - In large part caused by the existence of the train line - passenger trains started to run with ever increasing frequency, and the line would be electrified in 1937. The station was never modernized, and therefore still has features dating to the original construction.

Notable places nearby
 Celso Lisboa University Centre (pt)

Platforms
Platform 1A: Towards Deodoro (Stopper)
Platform 1B: Towards Central do Brasil (Stopper)

References

External links 
 Supervia webpage

SuperVia stations